During the occupation of Norway by Nazi Germany, its Jewish community was subject to persecution and deported to extermination camps. Although at least 764 Jews in Norway were killed, over 1,000 were rescued with the help of non-Jewish Norwegians who risked their lives to smuggle the refugees out of Norway, typically to Sweden. , 67 of these individuals have been recognized by Yad Vashem as being Righteous Among the Nations. Yad Vashem has also recognized the Norwegian resistance movement collectively.

List

See also
 Rescuers of Jews during the Holocaust

References

External links 
Full list of Norwegians recognized by Yad Vashem

 
Norwegian Righteous Among the Nations
Norwegian